The Rodillo Negro (Black roller) is the name given to a golden generation of football players from Peru who represented Alianza Lima and the Peru national football team at domestic and international events. The period associated with this generation lasts throughout the 1930s up to the early 1940s. From a narrow view, the Rodillo Negro solely identifies Alianza Lima's forward line; from a broad perspective, the sobriquet applies to the whole squad and the players which reinforced it in the Peru national football team.

History

Beginnings

Undefeated in Peru

Undefeated in Chile

Return to Lima

¡Vamos Boys! 
The starting eleven of Sport Boys were called up to the national team.

Berlin Olympics 
Despite not earning a medal at the Olympic games, the players were awarded medals with the inscription "A los futbolistas peruanos campeones olympicos 1936" (in English: "To the Peruvian Football Players, 1936 Olympic Champions").

Heroes at home

Last in Argentina

Bolivarian champions 

Peru won the 1938 Bolivarian Games.

South American champions

Legacy

Players

Records

Honors

See also 

Sport in Peru
Football in Peru
Breslau Eleven
Golden Team
Nazio-Juve
Os Magriços
Wembley Wizards

References

Bibliography

External links 
Peru FA
Alianza Lima official website
FIFA team profile
ELO team records

Peru national football team
Alianza Lima
Sport Boys
Club Universitario de Deportes
Nicknamed groups of association football players